Concordia University Texas is a private university in Austin, Texas. The university offers undergraduate, graduate, and online degrees as well as an adult degree program for part-time and returning students.

Concordia University Texas is affiliated with the Lutheran Church–Missouri Synod (LCMS) and is a member of the Concordia University System, the seven-member association of LCMS colleges and universities. As a Lutheran university, Concordia's stated mission is to develop Christian leaders.

History

Concordia was founded in 1926 as Lutheran Concordia College of Texas, a four-year high school that prepared young men for careers in ministry and teaching. The school opened with 26 students on its original site along East Avenue (now Interstate 35) on the then northern outskirts of Austin, Texas. In 1929, a two-story classroom building, later called the Music Building, and still later known as College Central, was built.

Concordia was founded by members of Texas's Wendish immigrant community. The original main building, Kilian Hall, is named for John Kilian, founder of the first Texas Lutheran church associated with the LCMS and leader of a large group of Wends (also called Sorbs) who settled in the Serbin area. Today, between 10 and 15 percent of Concordia's faculty, staff and students are of Wendish heritage.

Throughout the 1940s and 1950s, many buildings were added to the campus, such as Hirschi Memorial Library in 1949 and Kramer Hall, the college's first fully air-conditioned classroom building, in 1950, but dedicated on February 25, 1951. Also in 1951, Concordia started using a two-year junior college curriculum.

Building developments on campus continued throughout the 1950s and 1960s. The campus built its chapel, named Birkmann Memorial Chapel, in 1952. Texas Hall, which housed dining services and faculty offices was dedicated in 1953. Studtmann Hall, an all-girl's dormitory opened in 1955. The first Beto Hall on the Concordia campus was built in 1969 and housed science labs. In the early 21st century, this building was converted into the school's mail services facility.

In 1955, Concordia admitted women as students for the first time and the institution changed its name to Concordia Lutheran College in 1965. In 1969, the four-year high school program was disbanded and Concordia's curriculum expanded to four years after receiving permission to award Bachelor of Arts degrees in 1980.

Concordia joined the Concordia University System (CUS) in 1993. The CUS represents the colleges and universities run by the LCMS. In 1995, under the leadership of President Rev. Dr. David Zersen, the name of the institution was changed to Concordia University at Austin. The Accelerated Degree Program (ADP), with sites in Austin, Fort Worth, Houston, and San Antonio, within the College of Adult Education, was launched in 1995 to offer working adults the opportunity to earn a degree. Harms Hall, a dormitory, opened in January 2000, more than doubling campus resident capacity. The first graduate program was developed during this period.

In 2002, Dr. Thomas E. Cedel, a former fighter pilot and colonel in the United States Air Force was named president of the university.

In 2007, Concordia University at Austin changed its name to Concordia University Texas.

New campus
In 2005, the Board of Regents approved the relocation of the Concordia University Texas campus. Since its founding the school had occupied a  campus near downtown Austin. Construction began in the spring of 2007, and the new campus opened in September 2008, with its formal dedication on October 26, 2008.

The city of Austin allowed the demolition of the former campus. A developer bought the space with plans to construct a mixed-use development; however, the developer filed for bankruptcy in 2011.

The site for Concordia's new campus is the former Schlumberger Austin Systems Center. The site, formerly a research and development facility, had six buildings connected by covered walkways and encircled by a nature trail. The six buildings, named with the letters A–F, while extensively renovated, retain their basic design and features, including solid oak trim, large windows, sky lights, and atria.

Three new structures were built prior to occupation of the new campus: student housing, a fieldhouse, and a front entry/guard house. In addition to the new structures, 600 additional parking spaces and new roads were built to handle the increased campus traffic. In 2014, Concordia broke ground on a softball field that was completed in 2016.

The campus includes a  nature preserve that has springs, wetlands, caves, dense trees, and wildlife. A 10-A federal permit is required and only one other higher education institution carries one. The inclusion of the nature preserve allows Concordia to devote time to urban environmentalism in the Austin community. The Concordia University Nature Preserve is part of the Balcones Canyonlands Preserve, a system of preserves in western Travis County that provides habitat for a number of rare and endangered plant and animal species such the Golden-cheeked warbler and Black-capped vireo, two rare species of songbirds that breed in Central Texas.

In 2013, Dr. Thomas E. Cedel, announced his retirement from Concordia University Texas. In 2014, the former dean of the College of Business, Dr. Don Christian, was named chief executive officer.

Academics
Concordia University Texas has majors, minors, and programs of study within four colleges: Business & Communication, Nursing (accredited by the Texas Nursing Board and CCNE), Education, and Arts & Sciences. Concordia is accredited by the Southern Association of Colleges and Schools Commission on Colleges.

Campus life
Some of the many clubs and organizations that students participate in are: Concordia University Texas Collegiate DECA, Concordia Outdoor Ministry, Service-Learning, Missions Club, Communication Club, Student Government & Leadership Association (SGLA), Concordia Youth Ministry Team (CYMT), Fellowship of Christian Athletes, Helping Hands, History Club, Preseminarians of CTX, Society for Human Resource Management, Psychology Book Club, Kinesiology Club, Financial Management Association, Education Club, Directors of Christian Education Club, Biology Club, Behavioral Sciences Club, Association of Computing Machinery, Academic Advising Consultants, Model Organization of American States (MOAS), Moot Court, and the Spirit Squad. The school newspaper, The Mullet, was first published in 2006, and in 2013 was renamed The Spin. The Spin is published once a month during the semester.

Athletics
The Concordia mascot is the Tornados and the school colors are purple and gold. Concordia's intercollegiate athletic teams participate in NCAA Division III's American Southwest Conference (ASC). Concordia adopted the Tornados mascot in 1995, the year the school renamed itself; its previous team names were the Outlaws (1926-1936), the Cardinals (1936-1951), and the Stags (1951-1995). Prior to moving to NCAA Division III and joining the ASC, the Stags/Tornados were members of the National Association of Intercollegiate Athletics Heart of Texas Conference from 1994 to 1999.

The athletic programs at Concordia are baseball, softball, men's basketball, women's basketball, cross country, golf, men's soccer, women's soccer, track and field, volleyball, tennis and athletic training. There were four athletic facilities on the old campus (Fascholz-Keller Field (baseball), Bartholomew Park (softball), Pharr Tennis Center, Woltman Gymnasium) and one off-campus (St. Francis School (soccer)). Currently, men's and women's soccer play at Round Rock Multipurpose Complex.

In spring 2011, "Purple Out" events were started to encourage students, staff, and the community to support athletics. On designated "Purple Out" days, everyone is encouraged to wear purple and those attending a sporting event receive purple "Tornado Towels". In 2011–2012, Concordia Texas experienced its most successful year athletically. This was accomplished by winning ASC Championships in women's cross country, women's basketball, and men's baseball (second consecutive championship).

Basketball 
In the 2011–2012 season, the Concordia University Texas' women's basketball team won the American Southwest Conference.

The Concordia Men's basketball team has been coached by Stanley Bonewitz Jr. since 2004. He is a former Texas Tech basketball standout. As a player, he was named Texas "Mr. Basketball" in 1995.

Baseball 
The Concordia men's baseball team is coached by Clint Mokry, who was hired in December 2022 following the death of former major leaguer Tommy Boggs. Coach Boggs led the team to victory in 2011 as the ASC Conference Champions, and later to the NCAA championship tournament where they fell two games short of advancing to the College World Series. In 2012, the team recorded its best record ever and swept the ASC conference tournament to win the conference title outright for a second consecutive year. Prior to Boggs' tenure, Mike Gardner had been head coach since 1998. He retired at the end of the 2009 season as the winningest coach in school baseball history and led the team to its only appearance in the College World Series in 2002. Tornado Field, home of the baseball team, debuted on the new campus in February 2011 and was dedicated in April 2011.

Other sports 
Chris Randle became the first student athlete from Concordia to qualify for the NCAA track and field championship tournament. Randle's participation marked the first time in school history that Concordia was represented at the NCAA Division III Championships in two sports during the same academic year, as the baseball team won the ASC title and won two games over nationally ranked opponents – Linfield and Redlands – at the West Regional.

In 2009, Concordia inducted its first Hall of Fame class, including the 2002 baseball team that played for the NCAA Division III College World Series and Atlanta Braves reliever Scott Linebrink.

In 2011, three more members were inducted: Kenneth DeBord 2002, basketball; Lisa Hintz 1988, volleyball and basketball: and Linda Lowery, who served stints as the athletic director, volleyball coach, and men's and women's golf coach from 1980 to 2008.

Alumni
 Scott Linebrink, baseball player
 Richard John Neuhaus, theologian and cultural commentator
 Randy Phillips, musician, of Phillips, Craig and Dean

Photo gallery

References

External links

Official website
Official athletics website

 
Liberal arts colleges in Texas
Universities and colleges in Austin, Texas
Universities and colleges affiliated with the Lutheran Church–Missouri Synod
Universities and colleges accredited by the Southern Association of Colleges and Schools
Educational institutions established in 1926
Sorbian-American culture in Texas
1926 establishments in Texas
Private universities and colleges in Texas